Donald E. Lancaster is an American author, inventor, and microcomputer pioneer.

Background
Lancaster is a writer and engineer, who authored multiple articles for computer and electronics magazines of the 1970s, including Popular Electronics, Radio Electronics, Dr. Dobb's Journal, 73 Magazine, and Byte. He has written books on electronics, computers, and entrepreneurship, both commercially published and self-published.

One of his early projects was "TV Typewriter" dumb terminal. The design was accepted by early microcomputer users as it used an ordinary television set for the display and could be built for around USD$200 in parts, at a time when commercial terminals were selling for over $1,000.

Lancaster was an early advocate and developer of what is now known as print-on-demand technology.

Lancaster produced his self-published books by re-purposing the game port of an Apple II to transfer PostScript code directly to a laser printer, rather than using a Macintosh running PageMaker. This enabled continuous book production using an inexpensive Apple II, rather than tying up an expensive Macintosh until the print run was complete.

He formerly held a ham radio license (K3BYG).

Lancaster publishes articles related to his areas of interest on his website, The Guru's Lair.

Education
Don graduated from North Allegheny High School in Wexford, Pennsylvania.  He has received a BSEE degree from Lafayette College in 1961, and a MSEE from Arizona State University in 1967.

Publications
IC books
 RTL Cookbook (1ed, 1969) (3ed, 2010, archive)
 TTL Cookbook (1ed, 1974, archive)
 CMOS Cookbook (1ed, 1977) (4ed, 2019, archive)
 Active Filter Cookbook (1ed, 1975) (2ed, 1995, archive)

Project books
 TV Typewriter Cookbook (1ed, 1976) (3ed, 2010, archive)
 Cheap Video Cookbook (1ed, 1978, archive)
 Son of Cheap Video (1ed, 1980, archive)

Apple books
 Assembly Cookbook for Apple II/IIe (1ed, 1984) (3ed, 2011)
 Enhancing Your Apple II - Volume 1 (1ed, 1985)
 Enhancing Your Apple II and IIe - Volume 2 (1ed, 1985)
 Applewriter Cookbook (1ed, 1986)

Programming books
 The Hexadecimal Chronicles (1981) 
 Don Lancaster's Micro Cookbook (Sams, 1982) 

Other
 The Incredible Secret Money Machine (1978) 
 The Incredible Secret Money Machine II
 Book-On-Demand Resource Kit
 The Case Against Patents: Selected Reprints from "Midnight Engineering" & "Nuts & Volts" Magazines (Synergetics Press, January 1996). Paperback

References

External links
 Don Lancaster's Guru's Lair (official site)
 Don's general bio
 Don's detailed bio
 List of Don's magazine articles

American technology writers
Living people
Year of birth missing (living people)
Amateur radio people